Baron Colyton, of Farway in the County of Devon and of Taunton in the County of Somerset, is a title in the Peerage of the United Kingdom. It was created on 19 January 1956 for the diplomat and Conservative politician Henry Hopkinson. He notably served as Minister of State for the Colonies from 1952 to 1955. He resided at Netherton Hall in the parish of Farway, Devon. , the title is held by his grandson, the second Baron, who succeeded in 1996.

Barons Colyton (1956) 
 Henry Lennox D'Aubigne Hopkinson, 1st Baron Colyton (1902–1996)
 Alisdair John Munro Hopkinson, 2nd Baron Colyton (b. 1958)

The heir apparent is the present holder's son Hon. James Patrick Munro Hopkinson  (b. 1983)

Line of Succession

  Henry Lennox D'Aubigne Hopkinson, 1st Baron Colyton (1902—1996)
 Hon. Nicholas Henry Eno Hopkinson (1932—1991)
  Alisdair John Munro Hopkinson, 2nd Baron Colyton (born 1958)
 (1) Hon. James Patrick Munro Hopkinson (b. 1983)
 (2) Hon. Thomas Charles Robert Hopkinson (b. 1985)
 (3) Charles Henry Kenneth Hopkinson (b. 1960)
 (4) Frederick Nicholas Hugo Hopkinson (b. 1990)
 (5) Henry Jonathan Arthur Hopkinson (b. 1992)

Arms

Notes

References 
 Kidd, Charles, Williamson, David (editors). Debrett's Peerage and Baronetage (1990 edition). New York: St Martin's Press, 1990, 
 

Baronies in the Peerage of the United Kingdom
Noble titles created in 1956
Noble titles created for UK MPs